Until Death is a 1988 Italian made-for-TV horror film directed by Lamberto Bava.

Plot
Linda (Gioia Scola) and her lover Carlo (David Brandon) committed a horrible crime: eight years ago they murdered the woman's husband, Luca (Roberto Pedicini), while she was pregnant with his son. They hid the corpse and since then they are running a small hotel near a popular fishing lake. One rainy night a drifter named Marco (Urbano Barberini) arrives to the hotel, but he seems to know too many details about Linda's dead husband.

Production
Following the success of the film Demons and Demons 2 and other foreign horror films in Italy, the company Reiteitalia would announce in July 1986 that a series titled Brivido giallo which would be made featuring five made-for-television film directed by Lamberto Bava. Of these films only four would be made: Graveyard Disturbance, Until Death, The Ogre and Dinner with a Vampire. The films were shot between 1987 and 1988.

Until Death was based on an older script by Dardano Sacchetti. Director Lucio Fulci claimed to have created the original story for the film with a title Evil Comes Back based on the 1934 novel The Postman Always Rings Twice. Fulci claimed that Sacchetti then wrote it up and submitted it to several producers with Fulci's name attached, and then found it sold to Luciano Martino with only Sacchetti's name attached. Fulci stated he decided not to sue Sacchetti but broke off all relations with the screenwriter. Sacchetti claims that he was working on a script trying about sex and ghosts but couldn't choose which one to focus on and that Fulci asked him what he was working on which was a pseudo-sequel to The Postman Always Rings Twice. Sacchetti claimed that Fulci had taken it from producer to producer without it going into production and went as far as having it translated into English without Sacchetti's knowledge. While working on Brivido giallo, Sacchetti stated that Bava knew about the script and asked if it was still available for the series as they required one more episode.

Release 
Until Death was released on home video in Germany in November 1988 before the film had its television premiere in Italy. The film was shown in Italy on August 15, 1989 on Italia 1. In some markets, the film was promoted as a sequel to the film The Changeling as The Changeling 2.

MYA Communications released the film for the first time ever on region 1 DVD in 2009 with the Until Death title.

References

Footnotes

Sources

External links 

 

1988 horror films
Films directed by Lamberto Bava
1980s supernatural horror films
Italian supernatural horror films
Films scored by Simon Boswell
1988 television films
1988 films
Italian television films
Horror television films
1980s Italian-language films
1980s Italian films